Harry Hasso (born Karl Hartnagel; 24 July 1904 – 11 July 1984) was a Swedish actor, cinematographer and film director.

Hasso was born in Frankenthal, Germany. He worked in Sweden, Germany and Italy and for a short time in Finland as a cameraman and film director and he also wrote some of the music and manuscripts for some of the films he made. He learned to play the violin at a very young age and also played harmonica. He started his career in Luxembourg when was 16 years old. He started his own film company at age 18.  He made many movies and at least 100 documentary films among them films about his home country and home town. All the documentaries he made have been missing since World War II. Occasionally he was an actor in some of his films.

He also worked in a circus as an acrobat and according to himself his act there was to stand on one hand on a bottle that was placed on a chair.
He married the Swedish actress Signe Hasso in 1933. In 1943 he married the Swedish film actress Viveca Lindfors. Both were successful actresses in the United States. Viveca worked also in the theatre with great success. Signe Hasso has a star in the Hollywood Walk of Fame and was a famous Hollywood movie star with long career and an author of several books and a musician. Harry remarried twice after that. His last wife was the Swedish actress Britta Hasso (1936 - 2015) who later after their marriage became a journalist in Helsingborg at the newspaper Helsingborgs Dagblad. They married in 1961 and remained married until his death in 1984.

Selected filmography
 False Greta (1934)
 Eva Goes Aboard (1934)
 House of Silence (1988) (1933) [Cinematographer] [Actor]
 Pengar från skyn (1938) [Cinematographer]
 In Paradise (1941)
 The Talk of the Town (1941) [Cinematographer]
 If I Could Marry the Minister (1941) [Cinematographer]
 The Yellow Clinic (1942) [Cinematographer]
 The Woman of Sin (1942)
 Border Post 58 (1951)
 Maria Johanna (1953) [Cinematographer] [Director] [Actor] [Writer]

References

External links
 
 
 His private clip book (In Swedish.)
 His grandsons Film Company - (In Swedish.)

1904 births
1984 deaths
People from Frankenthal
Swedish male film actors
Swedish cinematographers
Swedish film directors
People from the Palatinate (region)
20th-century Swedish male actors